Darabani is a town in Botoșani County, Western Moldavia, Romania, and is the northernmost town in Romania. It administers three villages: Bajura, Eșanca and Lișmănița.

The area is a setting for the 2019 Amazon Studios TV series Hanna and plays a significant role in the development of the titular character from that series.

References

Populated places in Botoșani County
Localities in Western Moldavia
Towns in Romania
Populated places on the Prut
Monotowns in Romania